USS Maryland was a sloop-of-war in the United States Navy. She served during the Quasi-War with France.

Maryland was built by public subscription in Baltimore under the Act of 30 June 1798; launched at Price Shipyard, Baltimore, 3 June 1799; and accepted by the Navy in August 1799, Captain John Rodgers in command.

Maryland departed Baltimore 13 September 1799 for the Surinam station. Arriving 1 October, the sloop cruised from French Guiana to Curaçao protecting American shipping from attacks by French warships and privateers. The Napoleonic Wars were ongoing in Europe and the French were searching and seizing merchant vessels trading with the British West Indies, causing much loss to American commerce. Maryland captured the schooner Clarissa, an American slave trader without papers 4 January 1800, and then on 26 July fell in with and recaptured without a fight the Portuguese brig Gloria da Mar, which had been captured by French privateer Cherry only 13 days previous.

The sloop left Surinam for home 9 August 1800, having served since December 1799 as the only American naval vessel on the Surinam station. Sailing by way of St. Kitts, and St. Thomas, Maryland escorted a large convoy of American and British merchant vessels to safe waters, in addition to capturing Aerial, an American merchantman without papers on 2 September.

Maryland arrived at Baltimore on 1 October for repairs. The sloop departed Baltimore on 22 March 1801 with Congressman John Dawson of Virginia, President Adams' designated bearer of the amended and ratified Treaty of Mortefontaine with France, and arrived Havre de Grâce, France, in early May. The sloop remained until 15 July, when, because of difficulties in obtaining ratification, she was released by Congressman Dawson and sent home. Carrying several diplomatic passengers and important letters and dispatches, she returned to her home port Baltimore 28 August. Captain Rodgers discharged the crew and then sold Maryland on 2 October 1801 for $20,200.

References
 

 

Sloops of the United States Navy
Quasi-War ships of the United States
1799 ships